Risknamaa  is a 2019 Indian Hindi-language action thriller film directed by Aarun Nagar. The film is produced by Kirti Motion Pictures and CSK Production. It features Sachin Khari in the lead role, who play the double role. The movie also has Shahbaz Khan, Pramod Moutho, Ravi verma The film was shot in Rajasthan. It was a commercial Hit Movie.

Plot 
Sher Singh is the village Sarpanch. A law stated that whoever falls in love will face the death penalty. Sarpanch Sher Singh has killed many boys and girls who loved each other. Sarpanch falls in love with a girl.

Cast
Sachin Khari
Aarun Nagar
Shahbaz Khan
Pramod Moutho
Ravi Verma
 Javed Haider
 Ravi Sharma

Soundtrack 

The music was composed by Ashish Donald with lyrics by Sanjit Nirmal. The score was composed by Dev Chauhan.

References

External links 
 

2019 films
Indian romantic thriller films
2010s Hindi-language films
2010s romantic thriller films